Following is a list of notable alumni and faculty of the Columbia University Graduate School of Journalism, a graduate school of the American Columbia University, located in New York City, New York.

A–G

Adamu Adamu, minister of education in Nigeria
 Margot Adler, anchor, National Public Radio
 Ebenezer Ako-Adjei, Ghanaian politician; a founding father of Ghana; member of the Big Six
 Jeannine Amber, journalist and author; former senior writer at Essence.
 Daniel Arnall, executive producer for news, Bloomberg Television; former senior producer for business coverage, ABC News
 Amotz Asa-El, senior commentator, former executive editor, Jerusalem Post. 
 Spencer Bailey, editor-in-chief, Surface
 Russ Baker, investigative reporter, founder of The Real News Project and editor-in-chief of whowhatwhy.org.
 David W. Ball, novelist and short-story writer
 Wayne Barrett, senior editor and investigative reporter, Village Voice
 Ralph Begleiter, distinguished journalist in residence, University of Delaware
 Elizabeth Benjamin, political reporter, Daily News
 Robert Henry Best, propagandist for Nazi Germany
 Ryan Blitstein, freelance business reporter
 Louis Boccardi, retired CEO, Associated Press; Freedom Forum Foundation
 Geraldine Brooks, Pulitzer Prize-winning novelist
 Paul J. Browne, vice president public affairs, University of Notre Dame; former deputy commissioner of the New York City Police Department
 Pat Buchanan, Republican party strategist, presidential advisor, presidential candidate, conservative columnist, television commentator
 Elizabeth Bumiller, correspondent, The New York Times
 Greg Burke, senior communications adviser with Vatican's Secretariat of State (2012–)
 Marcy Burstiner, professor of journalism
 Robert Campbell, architect and journalist; former architecture critic, The Boston Globe
 Bennett Cerf, co-founder of Random House (deceased)
 David Cho, journalist for The Washington Post
 Gina Chua, executive editor, Reuters
 Leah Hager Cohen, writer, formerly of Houghton Mifflin
 Lisa R. Cohen, Emmy-winning television producer, author
 Richard Cohen, former reporter and columnist, Washington Post
 Sheila Coronel, Academic Dean at Columbia Journalism School and winner of the 2003 Magsaysay Award for Journalism, Literature and the Creative Communication Arts
 Judith Crist, film and television critic; professor, Columbia Graduate School of Journalism
 May Cutler, publisher, founder of Tundra Books; first Canadian woman to publish children's books; first woman to serve as Mayor of Westmount, Quebec
 Sadanand Dhume, author
 Jonathan Dunn-Rankin, actor, television journalist and gay activist
 Barkha Dutt, former managing director,  NDTV 24/7, India
 Yashica Dutt, writer
 Jim Dwyer, reporter, The New York Times
 Thomas Byrne Edsall, Joseph Pulitzer II and Edith Pulitzer Moore Professor, Columbia School of Journalism 2006–2014; The Washington Post; contributing op-ed writer The New York Times 
Alan Ehrenhalt, senior editor for Governing, contributing writer to The New York Times, etc.
 Aatos Erkko, Finnish publishing magnate, owner of Sanoma Corporation, son of foreign minister Eljas Erkko
 Lolis Eric Elie, journalist, documentary filmmaker; Columbia Graduate School of Journalism "2012 Alumni of the Year"
 Helen Epstein arts journalist, author Children of the Holocaust and nine other no-fiction books
 Stephan Faris, freelance journalist, has written from Africa and Middle East, primarily for Time magazine
 Howard Fineman, editorial director and reporter for The Huffington Post; MSNBC contributor
 Rob Fishman, co-founder of Niche, a company acquired by Twitter
 Cardinal John P. Foley, Grand Master of the Order of the Holy Sepulchre
 Robert Giles, curator, The Nieman Foundation for Journalism at Harvard University
 David Gonzalez, journalist, The New York Times
 John M. Goshko, M.A., journalist for The Washington Post
 Mel Gussow, former theatre critic, The New York Times (deceased)

H–M

 LynNell Hancock, education writer; professor, Columbia Graduate School of Journalism
 Donna Hanover, co-host, WOR radio morning show; ex-wife of Rudy Giuliani
 James Higdon, author of a nonfiction book on the Cornbread Mafia, cannabis journalist for POLITICO and the Washington Post
 Jessica Huseman, editorial director of Votebeat
 Hy Hollinger, entertainment trade editor and journalist (The Hollywood Reporter, Variety)
 Molly Ivins, reporter, author and syndicated political columnist 
 Joseph Jackson, assistant drama editor at The New York World and Hollywood screenwriter

 Paul Janensch, former executive editor of The Courier-Journal
 Nigel Jaquiss, Pulitzer Prize-winning investigative reporter for Willamette Week
 Soterios Johnson, host of NPR’s Morning Edition on WNYC
 Mary Jordan, Pulitzer Prize-winning American journalist for the Washington Post
 Kwame Karikari, Ghanaian journalist and academic; Director  General of Ghana Broadcasting Corporation (1982–1984)
 Frederick Kempe, president and chief executive officer, Atlantic Council of the United States
 Philip Klein (editor)
 Steve Kroft, journalist, 60 Minutes
 Madeleine M. Kunin, former Governor of Vermont; Marsh scholar-professor at large, University of Vermont; founder of Institute for Sustainable Communities
 Howard Kurtz, media reporter, The Washington Post; host of CNN's "Reliable Sources"
 Erik Larson, author of The Devil in the White City; contributor, Time magazine; 2004 Edgar Award; finalist National Book Award
 Bernard Le Grelle, Belgian investigative journalist, political adviser, author, former United Nations expert and public affairs executive.
 Joseph Lelyveld, former executive editor and columnist, The New York Times; Pulitzer Prize-winning journalist and author
 Juanita León, Colombian journalist; and founder, La Silla Vacía website
 Flora Lewis, foreign-affairs columnist, The New York Times (deceased)
 Bill Lichtenstein, Peabody Award-winning print and broadcast journalist and documentary producer and president, Lichtenstein Creative Media
 A. J. Liebling, journalist closely associated with The New Yorker from 1935 until his death
 Kathryn Lilley, mystery writer
 Samuel Lubell, journalist, pollster, and political commentator; National Book Award for Nonfiction finalist (1957)
 Robert L. Lynn, president of Louisiana College from 1975 to 1997; former journalist 
 Andrea Mackris, CNN producer
 Suzanne Malveaux, White House correspondent, CNN
 Gabriele Marcotti, sports writer
 Mark Mathabane, writer and lecturer
 Eileen McNamara, Pulitzer Prize-winning columnist, The Boston Globe; professor of journalism at Brandeis University
 John McWethy, former national security correspondent, ABC News (deceased)
 Andrew Meldrum, South African correspondent, The Guardian and The Observer
 Carol Marbin Miller, Senior Investigative Reporter, The Miami Herald
 Janice Min, media executive, oversees Billboard and The Hollywood Reporter, former editor of Us Weekly
 Michele Montas, spokesperson, United Nations Secretary-General Ban Ki-moon; formerly with Radio Haiti 	
 Walt Mossberg, executive editor, The Verge and co-founder, Re/code
 Ali Mustafa, broadcast journalist, CNBC 2005–2006, Dawn News TV 2006–2009

N–Z

 Alanna Nash, journalist and biographer; Society of Professional Journalists' 1994 National Member of the Year
 Viveca Novak, Washington correspondent for Time; frequent guest on CNN, NBC, PBS, and Fox
 Timothy L. O'Brien, editor, The New York Times Sunday Business section; has written for The Wall Street Journal
 Mirta Ojito, contributor, The New York Times; Pulitzer Prize winner for National Reporting in 2001; professor, Columbia Graduate School of Journalism
 Ralph Judson Palmer, California newspaper publisher
Malini Parthasarathy, former editor, The Hindu
Basharat Peer (Journalist) – Kashmiri American journalist, script writer, author, and political commentator. Author, Curfewed Night
 Gabe Pressman (1924–2017), long-time New York City reporter
 John Quiñones, ABC News host and correspondent
 Narasimhan Ram, editor-in-chief, The Hindu
 Zoe Ramushu, South Africa based Zimbabwean writer, director, producer
 Robin Reisig, professor, Columbia Graduate School of Journalism
 Gianni Riotta, editor-in-chief of Il Sole 24 Ore, former editor in chief of TG1 (RAI)
 Geraldo Rivera, television reporter and talk show host
 Manuel Rivera-Ortiz, documentary photographer
 Tanya Rivero, anchor, ABC News Now
 B. H. "Johnny" Rogers, former member of both houses of Louisiana State Legislature, faculty member at LSU (deceased)
 Gloria Rojas, television journalist
 James Rosen, journalist and novelist
 Tom Rosenstiel, director, Project for Excellence in Journalism
 Saskia de Rothschild, journalist, director of the Chateau Lafite Rothschild
 Wendy Ruderman, journalist, 2010 Pulitzer Prize for Investigative Reporting
 Christine Sadler, author, journalist, magazine editor (deceased)
 Dick Schaap, sports journalist, author (deceased)
 Andre Sennwald, New York Times motion picture critic (deceased)
 Evelyn Sharp, real estate businesswoman who owned the Beverly Wilshire Hotel
 Gail Sheehy, author
 Howard Simons, former curator of the Nieman Foundation for Journalism
 Allan Sloan, columnist and editor-at-large, Fortune Magazine
 Craig S. Smith, Shanghai bureau director of The New York Times and managing director for China
 Olivia Smith (journalist), Emmy award-winning journalist
 Sreenath Sreenivasan, professor, Columbia Graduate School of Journalism; technology reporter
 Guy Sterling, journalist and The Star Ledger and historian of Newark, NJ history.
 Alexander Stille, author; contributor, New York Magazine; San Paolo Professor of International Journalism at Columbia University
 Ron Suskind, author and investigative journalist; former reporter, The Wall Street Journal; Pulitzer Prize winner for Feature Writing in 1995
Tara Sutton, reporter, filmmaker
Kosuke Takahashi, journalist, television commentator and former editor-in-chief of The Huffington Post Japan
Julie Tilsner, writer and journalist
Maria Luisa Tucker, writer
 Mariana van Zeller, Peabody Award-winning television journalist
 Robert Whitcomb, American newspaperman, author
 Doris Willens, journalist, playwright and folk singer in the Baby Sitters
 Valerie Wilson Wesley, author; former executive editor, Essence magazine
 Emil Wilbekin, author; former editor-in-chief of Vibe and Giant, and editor-at-large of Essence magazine, founder of Native Son Now, Black & gay rights activist
 Emily Witt, author, contributor The New Yorker
 Hayley Woodin, M.Sc. journalism 2022 valedictorian (Columbia University), executive editor and multimedia journalist, contributor BBC
 Wayne Worcester, crime novelist; professor of journalism, University of Connecticut

See also

 List of Columbia University people

References 

Journalism
Columbia University Graduate School of Journalism